The 2013–14 season was Sloboda Užice's 4th consecutive season in the Serbian SuperLiga. Pre-season started on 9 July 2013. Sloboda kicked off the season at home against Spartak ZV on 10 August.First away game was against newly promoted Čukarički on 18 August.The stadium was upgraded with floodlights, for the first time in history of the club, from 1 September. Sloboda was relegated on 28 May after a 1–0 home loss to Voždovac.

Transfers

In

Out

Friendlies

Fixtures

Round

Results and positions by round

Serbian SuperLiga

Pld = Matches played; W = Matches won; D = Matches drawn; L = Matches lost; GF = Goals for; GA = Goals against; GD = Goal difference; Pts = Points

Serbian Cup

Round

Squad statistics

References

External links
 Serbian SuperLiga official website

FK Sloboda Užice
Sloboda Uzice